Red Sucker Lake is a designated place in northeast Manitoba, Canada adjacent to the Red Sucker Lake 1976 Indian Reserve, which is part of the Red Sucker Lake First Nation.

Demographics 

References 

Designated places in Manitoba
Northern communities in Manitoba
Island Lake Tribal Council
Unincorporated communities in Northern Region, Manitoba